Thomas A. Haskins (born August 11, 1973) is a former running back in the Canadian Football League.

College career
Haskins played for Virginia Military Institute for three seasons.  There, he finished his collegiate career holding 21 school records, co-holding 5 school records.  In addition to scoring 50 all-time touchdowns, he set the all-time rushing record for Division I-AA with 5349 yards.  As of 2002, this ranks him third all-time in Division I-AA.  As of 2008, Haskins is the only VMI football player to have his jersey number retired.  He is also set to be inducted into the VMI Sports Hall of Fame in November 2008.

Professional career
In 1997, Haskins joined the Montreal Alouettes of the CFL and played there for the next six seasons, winning a Grey Cup championship in his final year with the team.  On February 22, 2003, Haskins signed a free-agent contract with the Edmonton Eskimos.  However, a month later, Haskins suffered from a benign brain tumor the size of an orange which was removed.  As a result, Haskins did not suit up for a single game for the Eskimos.  Despite that, the Eskimos honoured his contract for the 2003 season.  In March 2004, Haskins was released by the Eskimos.  Despite vowing to return to professional football after recovering from the tumor, Haskins decided to retire.

External links
Just Sports Stats

Living people
1973 births
Montreal Alouettes players
Canadian football running backs
American players of Canadian football
VMI Keydets football players
American football running backs
African-American players of Canadian football
21st-century African-American sportspeople
20th-century African-American sportspeople